Penrith Lakes is an area located in the suburb of Penrith in the Western Sydney Region, it features lakes and parklands as well as recreational facilities.

Penrith lakes is managed by the Penrith Lakes Development Corporation (PLDC) which was formed in 1980 by the three companies that operated quarries in the area that joined together and combined their land. They planned to rehabilitate the land that was quarried so it could be used for recreational purposes with the Penrith Lakes Scheme.

The area also contains the Sydney International Regatta Centre which was one of the first parts of the Penrith Lakes Scheme to be completed. The Regatta Centre was one of the event locations used during the Sydney Summer Olympic Games in 2000.

References 

 Lakes of New South Wales